Zobida colon is a moth of the subfamily Arctiinae first described by Heinrich Benno Möschler in 1872. It is found in Ethiopia, South Africa and Bangladesh.

References

Moths described in 1872
Lithosiina